Gadchandur is a city and Municipal Council in Korpana Tashil Chandrapur district, Maharashtra, India. Gadchandur is named after the fort Chandur.

Transport 
Gadchandur has road transport including State Transport (ST) and private bus transport facility direct to Nagpur. Gadchandur also has railway station but presently only goods train are operating.

Nearby towns and cities
Nanda (7 km)
Jiwati (20km)
Rajura (21.0 km)
Korpana (20.0 km)
Ghugus  (30.0 km)
Ballarpur (31.0 km)

References

External links
 

Cities and towns in Chandrapur district